Aglaothorax morsei, or Morse's shieldback, is a species of shield-backed katydid in the family Tettigoniidae. It is found in North America.

Subspecies
These six subspecies belong to the species Aglaothorax morsei:
 Aglaothorax morsei costalis (Rentz & Weissman, 1981)
 Aglaothorax morsei curtatus (Rentz & Weissman, 1981)
 Aglaothorax morsei islandica (Rentz & Weissman, 1981)
 Aglaothorax morsei morsei (Caudell, 1907)
 Aglaothorax morsei santacruzae (Rentz & Weissman, 1981)
 Aglaothorax morsei tectinota (Rentz & Weissman, 1981)

References

Tettigoniinae
Articles created by Qbugbot
Insects described in 1907